Steve Pickton a.k.a. Stasis is an English electronic-techno musician, record producer and sound engineer. He started with a release on B12 Records under his Stasis moniker. After that, he released quite a number of 12"es and albums on several labels as Stasis, Paul W. Teebrooke, Phenomyna and The Otherworld Collective. His latest alias is Soul 223.

Steve Pickton's music is characterized by a very dreamy, melodic, melancholic and yet powerful, driving, energetic sound, combining Detroit-influenced beat patterns and basslines with beautiful string sounds.

Beside his solo work, he also collaborates with Mark Broom and Dave Hill as Kapé I'llmusier or Ted Howler Rhythm Combo.

He also set up a label called Otherworld.

Discography

Albums
 Inspiration - (Peacefrog Records, 1994)
 From The Old To The New - (Peacefrog Records, 1996)

Singles
 "Circuit Funk" (12") - (Peacefrog Records, 1993)
 "Disco 4000" (12") - (Time Is Right, 1993)
 "Likemind 01" (12") - (Likemind, 1993)
 "Point Of No Return!" (12") - (B12 Records, 1993)
 "History Of Future" E.P. (12", EP) - (Mo Wax Excursions, 1996)
 "Block" (12") - (Pure Plastic, 1997)
 "Sound Of Stas" (12") - (Multiplex, 1997)
 "Split" (7") - (Smallfish, 2001)
 "Past Movements" (3xLP) - (Peacefrog Records, 2003)
 "Old Skool Reunion" (12") - (Pure Plastic, 2005)

References

External links
 Steve Pickton at Discogs

English electronic musicians
Living people
Year of birth missing (living people)
Peacefrog Records artists